Mulberry Grove is a village in eastern Bond County, Illinois, United States. The population was 520 at the 2020 census.

History
Mulberry Grove has existed under the names Bucktown, Houston and Shakerag. A post office was established in 1834, and Mulberry Grove was incorporated as a village in 1857.

Geography
Mulberry Grove is located along Illinois Route 140 approximately one mile north of I-70. Greenville lies about seven miles to the west-southwest and Vandalia is about nine miles to the east-northeast. Owl Creek flows past the north side of town and joins Hurricane Creek about 1.5 mile to the east in adjacent Fayette County.

Demographics

As of the 2020 census there were 520 people, 344 households, and 175 families residing in the village. The racial makeup of the village was 93.08% White, 1.35% African American, 0.38% Native American, 0.00% Asian, 0.00% Pacific Islander, 0.38% from other races, and 4.81% from two or more races. Hispanic or Latino of any race were 0.96% of the population.

There were 344 households, out of which 56.69% had children under the age of 18 living with them, 40.70% were married couples living together, 1.16% had a female householder with no husband present, and 49.13% were non-families. 43.90% of all households were made up of individuals, and 26.45% had someone living alone who was 65 years of age or older. The average household size was 3.46 and the average family size was 2.46.

The village's age distribution consisted of 26.9% under the age of 18, 8.3% from 18 to 24, 27.7% from 25 to 44, 18.5% from 45 to 64, and 18.5% who were 65 years of age or older. The median age was 35.2 years. For every 100 females, there were 95.2 males. For every 100 females age 18 and over, there were 124.3 males.

The median income for a household in the village was $40,800, and the median income for a family was $46,823. Males had a median income of $34,063 versus $18,194 for females. The per capita income for the village was $19,672. About 14.3% of families and 31.3% of the population were below the poverty line, including 36.4% of those under age 18 and 35.7% of those age 65 or over.

References

External links
 Mulberry Grove Community School District #1
 Mulberry Grove Junior/Senior High School
 Mulberry Grove Elementary School
 Mulberry Grove First Baptist Church

Villages in Bond County, Illinois
Villages in Illinois
Populated places established in 1834
1834 establishments in Illinois